Pride of the Blue Grass is a 1939 American drama film directed by William C. McGann and written by Vincent Sherman. The film stars Edith Fellows, James McCallion, Granville Bates, Aldrich Bowker, Arthur Loft and William Hopper. The film was based on an actual 15-year-old blind horse, Elmer Gantry, who was co-billed as a star and played himself. Gantry was bought and trained as a show horse by wrangler Eleanor Getzendaner but became blind at the age of 13 following two years of experiencing periodic ophthalmia, after which she patiently trained him to jump.

The film was released by Warner Bros. on October 7, 1939.

Plot

When his father, a disreputable trainer of thoroughbred horses, is killed in a barn fire, young Danny Lowman is able to save the colt Gantry the Great. He gives the new colt to his friend Midge Griner, whose father Colonel Griner owns a stable.

Years pass as Danny moves west and grows up. Frustrated in an attempt to become a jockey, Danny is accused of illegally activities similar to his late father's and faces jail until Midge vouches for him, persuading her dad to give Danny a job. He is reunited with the colt, which has been violently abused by trainer Dave Miller.

The horse responds to Danny's presence in the saddle and begins winning races, saving the Griner stable, which had fallen on hard times. But its narrow defeat in the Kentucky Derby casts suspicion on Danny's effort. Later realizing that the horse has gone blind, possibly from Miller's harsh treatment, Danny and Midge still enter Gantry Jr. in a Grand National steeplechase race in England, where they are victorious and save the family farm.

Cast 
Edith Fellows as Midge Griner
James McCallion as Danny Lowman
Granville Bates as Col. Bob Griner
Aldrich Bowker as Judge
Arthur Loft as Dave Miller
William Hopper as Joe
Frankie Burke as Willie Hobson
Frederic Tozere as First Stranger 
Edgar Edwards as Second Stranger
John Butler as Mack Lowman
Sam McDaniel as Domino Jones 
Bernice Pilot as Beverly
Walter Fenner as Secretary to Board of Stewards
Raymond Brown as Sheriff Adams
Lawrence Grant as Lord Shropshire

References

External links 
 

1939 films
Warner Bros. films
American drama films
1939 drama films
Films directed by William C. McGann
American black-and-white films
American horse racing films
1930s English-language films
1930s American films
English-language drama films